Jordan Smith (born April 10, 1998) is an American football outside linebacker for the Jacksonville Jaguars of the National Football League (NFL). He played college football at Florida, Butler CC and UAB.

Early life and high school
Smith grew up in Lithonia, Georgia and attended Lithonia High School, where he played basketball and football. He had 71 tackles with 18.5 tackles for loss and 7.5 sacks as a junior. He was rated a four-star recruit and initially committed to play college football at the South Carolina during the summer before his senior year. As a senior, Smith led the team with 104 tackles and was named class AAAA All-State. He later flipped his commitment from South Carolina to the University of Florida.

College career
Smith began his collegiate career at Florida and redshirted his true freshman year. He was suspended for his redshirt freshman season along with eight other players due to his involvement in a credit card fraud scheme. After the season Smith transferred to Butler Community College in El Dorado, Kansas. In his only season with the Grizzlies, Smith had 77 tackles, 22.5 tackles for loss, 11 sacks, three pass breakups and a forced fumble and was named first-team All-Jayhawk Conference. Smith committed to continue his career at UAB over offers from UNLV and Marshall.

Smith became an immediate starter for the Blazers as a redshirt sophomore and was named second-team All-Conference USA after leading the team with 17.5 tackles for loss, ten sacks and four forced fumbles. Smith was named first-team all-conference after finishing his redshirt junior season with 43 tackles, 9.5 for loss, 4.5 sacks, and an interception.

Professional career
Smith was drafted by the Jacksonville Jaguars in the fourth round, 121st overall, of the 2021 NFL Draft. On May 18, 2021, Smith signed his four-year rookie contract with Jacksonville. After being inactive for the first 14 games, he made his NFL debut in Week 16.

On June 14, 2022, Smith was placed on injured reserve after suffering a knee injury during OTAs.

References

External links
Florida Gators bio
UAB Blazers bio

Living people
Players of American football from Georgia (U.S. state)
Sportspeople from DeKalb County, Georgia
American football defensive ends
UAB Blazers football players
Butler Grizzlies football players
Florida Gators football players
People from Lithonia, Georgia
Jacksonville Jaguars players
1998 births